The Sussex Rugby Football Union is the society responsible for rugby union in the county of Sussex, England and is one of the constituent bodies of the national Rugby Football Union.

History
The first rugby club in Sussex was Brighton, formed in 1868. Following the formation of several other clubs in the 1880s, the Sussex Rugby Football Union was formed in 1883, several years prior to the national organisation of which it is now a constituent part, with the most recent members admitted in 2008.

Sussex senior men's county team

Sussex currently play in Division 2 of the County Championship) having been promoted from Division 3 at the end of the 2018 competition.  Prior to this they reached the final of the 2017 Bill Beaumont County Championship Division 2 (the first time in the county's history), losing on try count to Oxfordshire (4 tries to 5) at Twickenham Stadium, after an exciting game that finished 29-29.

Sussex Senior Women's County Team 
Sussex currently play in Division 1 of the Gill Burns County Championship having been promoted from Division 2 at the end of the 2017-2018 season after winning the South East Region competition. In 2019 they reached the final of Division 1 Gill Burns County Championship at Twickenham Stadium (the first in the county's history), losing to Yorkshire 11-27.

Affiliated clubs
There are currently 34 full member adult clubs affiliated with the Sussex RFU, most of which have teams at both senior and junior level and are based in East Sussex or West Sussex.  

 Barns Green
 Bognor
 Brighton
 Brighton & Hove Sea Serpents
 Brighton and Sussex Medical School
 Burgess Hill
 Chichester
 Cinque Ports
 Crawley
 Crowborough
 Ditchling
 Eastbourne
 East Grinstead
 Hastings & Bexhill
 Haywards Heath
 Heathfield & Waldron
 Hellingly
 Holbrook
 Horsham
 Hove
 Lewes
 Littlehampton
 Midhurst
 Newick
 Plumpton
 Pulborough
 Rye
 St Francis
 Seaford
 Shoreham
 Steyning
 Sussex Police
 Uckfield
 Worthing Raiders

County club competitions 

The Sussex RFU currently runs the following club competitions for club sides based in East Sussex and West Sussex:

Leagues
There are also 6 Sussex specific leagues at levels 9-12 sponsored by brewer Harveys Brewery, and named for their range of beers.  These leagues contain a mixture of 1st, 2nd and 3rd teams.

Sussex Division 1 - league ranked at tier 9 of the English rugby union system)
Sussex Division 2 - tier 10 league
Sussex Division 2 Reserve - tier 10 league for Reserve teams
Sussex Division 3 - tier 11 league
Sussex Division 4 East - tier 12 league (East Sussex)
Sussex Division 4 West - tier 12 league (West Sussex)

Cups
Sussex Bob Rogers Cup
Sussex Bowl
Sussex Plate
Sussex Salver
Sussex Vase

See also
London & SE Division
English rugby union system

References

Rugby union governing bodies in England
1883 establishments in England
Sports organizations established in 1883
Rugby union in Sussex